This was the first edition of the tournament.

Marta Marrero and Antonella Serra Zanetti won the title by defeating Daniela Klemenschits and Sandra Klemenschits 6–4, 6–0 in the final.

Seeds

Draw

Draw

References
 Main and Qualifying Draws

Istanbul Cup - Doubles
İstanbul Cup